Belil (also Romanized as Belīl; also known as Mazra‘eh Bīlīr and Mazra‘eh-ye Bīlīr) is a village in Aqda Rural District, Aqda District, Ardakan County, Yazd Province, Iran. At the 2006 census, its population was 6, in 4 families.

References 

Populated places in Ardakan County